The BDO Corporate Center Ortigas at the Ortigas Center is an office skyscraper in Mandaluyong, Philippines. Located along ADB Avenue, It is one of the tallest building in Ortigas Center standing at almost . Its main tenant is Banco de Oro.

Architecture and design
The BDO Corporate Center designed by the architectural firms Arquitectonica and FSL& Associates, Co. The firm designed the BDO Corporate Center attained it Gold LEED certification for the building. Double glazed curtain walls, with ceramic frit are among the prominent features of the building. The 47-storey building was built on top of an already existing shopping mall building of The Podium.

Construction
The construction of the BDO Corporate Center commenced in the first half of 2012. Initially the building was planned to be completed by the first quarter of 2015 but the building was completed in November 2015.

About  was the estimated cost for the construction of the building.

Tenants
The building will be occupied by the banking firm Banco de Oro (BDO), the namesake of the building. The BDO Corporate Center was not meant to become a new headquarters of Banco de Oro. The banking firm's management's head office remained in Makati.

Reception
The main occupants of the BDO Corporate Center, Banco de Oro received three awards for the building at the Philippine Property Awards 2015, namely the Best Commercial Development, Best Office Development and Best Office Architectural Design awards.

References

Skyscrapers in Ortigas Center
Buildings and structures in Mandaluyong
Office buildings completed in 2015
Skyscraper office buildings in Metro Manila
Arquitectonica buildings